Wood Mountain may refer to:

 Wood Mountain, Saskatchewan, a village Saskatchewan, Canada
 Wood Mountain (electoral district), a Canadian federal electoral district in Saskatchewan
 Wood Mountain Regional Park, a regional park in Saskatchewan
 Wood Mountain Lakota First Nation, a First Nations in Saskatchewan
 Wood Mountain Post Provincial Park, a provincial park in Saskatchewan
 Wood Mountain Hills, a plateau in Saskatchewan
 Wood Mountain Formation, a geological formation in Saskatchewan
 Wood Mountain (Colorado), a mountain in Colorado, U.S.

See also 
 Woods Mountains, California
 Mount Wood (disambiguation)